Asghar Ali Jutt is a Pakistani politician who had been a member of the National Assembly of Pakistan from 2008 to 2013.

Political career
He was elected to the National Assembly of Pakistan from Constituency NA-167 (Vehari-I) as a candidate of Pakistan Peoples Party (PPP) in by-polls held in May 2010. He received 63,183 votes and defeated Nazir Ahmed Arain, a candidate of Awami Ittehad.

He ran for the seat of the National Assembly from Constituency NA-166 (Pakpattan-III) as an independent candidate in 2013 Pakistani general election, but was unsuccessful. He received 30,941 votes and lost the seat to Rana Zahid Hussain.

References

Living people
Pakistani MNAs 2008–2013
Year of birth missing (living people)